Tian Tian is a 275-pound male giant panda at the National Zoo in Washington D.C. The panda was born on August 27, 1997, at the China Conservation and Research Center for the Giant Panda at the Wolong National Nature Reserve in Sichuan Province, to Yong Ba (mother) and Pan Pan (father). Tian Tian is the half-brother of Bai Yun, formerly at the San Diego Zoo.

Giant pandas are thought to be solitary creatures, except for mating season and mothers with young cubs. Tian generally spends his time alone, except for brief periods during breeding season. Tian is able to see Mei Xiang, and any cub with her, through some mesh windows in the exhibit.  Male giant pandas play no part in raising their young in the wild. Tian and Mei are trained to participate in a full medical examination, including a blood draw, without anesthesia. The giant pandas enter a special squeeze cage with small openings and follow keeper instructions getting a food reward for participating.

Fatherhood

Tian Tian is a father by artificial insemination only. While he and Mei Xiang have been given multiple opportunities to mate naturally—and both are interested in doing so—they have never achieved the positioning correct. This is a problem with giant pandas born in captivity. In the summer of 2005, Mei gave birth to a male cub, Tai Shan, on July 9. In keeping with the agreement made at the time Tian Tian and Mei Xiang arrived in the United States, Tai Shan left the National Zoo on February 4, 2010 to return to his ancestral homeland in China. He flew there on the same flight as his cousin Mei Lan, who was born at Zoo Atlanta.

Some of Tian Tian's semen was preserved cryogenically, and used when Mei Xiang was artificially inseminated in 2012. Mei Xiang gave birth to a female cub on the night of September 16th of that year. The unnamed cub died of liver failure at a week old.

On August 23, 2013, Mei Xiang delivered a female cub who was later named Bao Bao. Her name was selected by the public and given on her 100th day of life. Approximately 23 hours after Bao Bao's birth, Mei Xiang delivered a second cub, also female, who was stillborn. Bao Bao lived at the National Zoo until February 21, 2017, to return to her ancestral homeland in China.

Tian Tian has been confirmed through genetic testing to be the father of two cubs, both male, born to Mei Xiang on August 22, 2015. One of the cubs was named Bei Bei by Michelle Obama and Peng Liyuan, the wives of the then American and Chinese presidents. The second cub died at 4 days old and was not named. Bei Bei lived at the National Zoo until November 19, 2019 to return to his ancestral homeland in China.

On August 21, 2020, another male cub named Xiao Qi Ji was born to Mei Xiang.

References

External links

 Giant Pandas at the National Zoo
 Meet the National Zoo Pandas

Individual giant pandas
1997 animal births
National Zoological Park (United States)